West Virginia Route 25 is an east–west state highway located within the counties of Kanawha and Putnam in the U.S. state of West Virginia. The western terminus of the route is at West Virginia Route 62 in Rock Branch (unincorporated) between the towns of Nitro and Poca. The eastern terminus is at U.S. Route 60 in Charleston.

Route Description

Major intersections

See also

 List of state highways in West Virginia

References

External links

025
Transportation in Kanawha County, West Virginia
Transportation in Putnam County, West Virginia